Slaves of the World is the seventh studio album by Norwegian black metal band Old Man's Child.  The album was released 18 May 2009 in Europe and 19 May 2009 in North America via Century Media Records. The album was recorded in autumn 2008 at Studio Fredman in Gothenburg, Sweden, with producer Fredrik Nordström. All instruments were recorded by Galder with the exception of drums, which were played by Peter Wildoer (Darkane).

Track listing
 "Slaves of the World" - 4:41
 "Saviours of Doom" - 4:03
 "The Crimson Meadows" - 4:34
 "Unholy Foreign Crusade" - 3:40
 "Path of Destruction" - 5:21
 "The Spawn of Lost Creation" - 4:07
 "On the Devil's Throne" - 4:49
 "Ferden Mot Fienden's Land" - 5:34
 "Servants of Satan's Monastery" - 5:19
 "Born of the Flickering" - 5:05 - Limited Edition Bonus Track

Personnel
Galder – vocals, guitar, bass, keyboards
Peter Wildoer – drums

Production
Produced by Fredrik Nordstrom
Engineered and mixed by Henrik Udd

Additional personnel
 Christophe Szpajdel — logo

References

External links
Official Old Man's Child Myspace
Official Old Man's Child Forum

2009 albums
Old Man's Child albums
Century Media Records albums
Albums produced by Fredrik Nordström
Albums recorded at Studio Fredman